A pay day or payday is a specified day of the week or month when one is paid, usually workers collecting wages from their employers.

Pay Day, PayDay or Payday may also refer to:

Arts, entertainment, and media

Films
 Pay Day (1918 film), a film by Sidney Drew
 Pay Day (1922 film), a film by Charlie Chaplin 
 Payday (1944 film), a short film
 Payday (1972 film), a film directed by Daryl Duke and written by Don Carpenter
 Payday (2018 film), a Nigerian comedy drama film

Games 
 Pay Day (board game), a board game by Parker Brothers
 Payday: The Heist (2011)
 Payday 2 (2013)
 Payday 3 (2023)

Music
 Payday (album), solo album by Lil' Fizz
 "Payday", song by Alesso
 "Payday", song by Jesse Winchester covered by Elvis Costello on Kojak Variety
 "Payday", song by Doja Cat from her 2021 album Planet Her

Television
Payday (Canadian TV series) (1973–1974), a television series
 "Payday" (M*A*S*H), a third-season episode of M*A*S*H
Payday (American TV series), a 2016 TV series on Vice

Other uses
PayDay (confection), a brand of candy bar made by Hershey Foods Corporation